Burnet 'Burnie' Payne (born 8 May 1939) is a former Australian rules footballer who played for Hobart in the Tasmanian National Football League (TANFL) and St Kilda in the Victorian Football League (VFL). He is a member of the Tasmanian Football Hall of Fame, having been inducted in 2005.

Payne make his TANFL debut at the age of just 16 and was a member of Hobart's 1959, 1960 and 1963 premiership teams. St Kilda then secured his services for the 1964 VFL season and he had a solid year, starting with three goals on debut and he later managed a six-goal haul in a win over South Melbourne. He finished second in St Kilda's goal-kicking, behind Darrel Baldock.

Due to family reasons, Payne returned to Tasmania after just one season on the mainland. He won William Leitch Medals in 1965 and 1966 to become the first Hobart player to win it back to back. A premiership player again in 1966, Payne spent the 1969 and 1970 season as captain-coach.

He was a regular Tasmanian interstate representative, appearing in a total of 16 matches, including the 1966 Hobart and 1969 Adelaide Carnivals. Payne retired at the end of 1973 but continued his coaching career at Kingston.

References

Holmesby, Russell and Main, Jim (2007). The Encyclopedia of AFL Footballers. 7th ed. Melbourne: Bas Publishing.

1939 births
Australian rules footballers from Tasmania
St Kilda Football Club players
Hobart Football Club players
Hobart Football Club coaches
William Leitch Medal winners
Tasmanian Football Hall of Fame inductees
Living people